Christa Gail Pike (born March 10, 1976) is an American convicted murderer, and the youngest woman to be sentenced to death in the United States during the post-Furman period. She was 20 when convicted of the torture murder of her classmate Colleen Slemmer, which she committed at age 18.

Pike lived a troubled life and dropped out of high school. She joined the Job Corps, a government program aimed at helping low-income youth by offering vocational training and career skills, and attended the now-closed Job Corps center in Knoxville, Tennessee. Pike began dating a man a year her junior named Tadaryl Shipp. Together, they developed interest in the occult and devil worship.

Crime 
Christa became jealous of her friend, university student 19-year-old Colleen Slemmer, who she thought was trying to "steal" her boyfriend from her; friends of Slemmer denied the accusations. Along with friend Shadolla Peterson, 18, Pike planned to lure Slemmer to an isolated, abandoned steam plant near the University of Tennessee campus.

On January 12, 1995, Pike, Shipp, Peterson, and Slemmer signed out of the dormitory and proceeded to the woods, where Slemmer was told they wanted to make peace by offering her some marijuana. Upon arrival at the secluded location, Slemmer was attacked by Pike and Shipp while Peterson acted as lookout. According to later court testimony, for the next thirty minutes Slemmer was taunted, beaten, and slashed; and a pentagram was carved in her chest. Finally, Pike smashed Slemmer's skull with a large chunk of asphalt, killing her. Pike kept a piece of Slemmer's skull.

Pike began to show off the piece of skull around the school, and within thirty-six hours the three were arrested. The log book showed that Pike, Shipp, Peterson, and Slemmer left together and only three returned. Detectives found the piece of skull in Pike's jacket pocket. The suspects' rooms were searched and a copy of the Satanic Bible was found in Shipp's. Soon after her arrest, Pike confessed to police of the torture and killing of Slemmer, but insisted they were merely trying to scare her and it got out of control.

Trial 
During Pike's trial, the prosecution was aided by evidence and Pike's confession. Pike was charged with first degree murder and conspiracy to commit murder. On March 22, 1996, after only a few hours of deliberation, Pike was found guilty on both counts. On March 30, Pike was sentenced to death by electrocution for the murder charge and 25 years in prison for the conspiracy charge. Shipp received a life sentence with the possibility of parole plus 25 years. Peterson, who had turned informant, received probation for pleading guilty to being an accessory after the fact.

Appeals of conviction 
Following the guilty verdict, Pike "launched, cancelled and then re-launched" an appeal of her conviction in the Tennessee state courts. In June 2001, then again in June 2002, against the advice of her lawyers, Pike asked the courts to drop her appeal and sought to be executed via electrocution. Criminal Court Judge Mary Beth Leibowitz granted the request and an execution date of August 19, 2002, was set. Pike soon thereafter changed her mind and on July 8, 2002, defense lawyers filed a motion to allow the appeal process to continue. This motion was denied. However, on August 2, 2002, a three judge state appeals court panel ruled that the proceedings should be continued and the execution was not carried out. In December 2008, Pike's latest request for a new trial was turned down and she was returned to death row. With this denial Pike's allowed appeals under the rules and procedures of the State of Tennessee's criminal justice system were exhausted.

In May 2014 Pike's lawyers entered an appeal in the federal court system. Her lawyers sought a commutation of the sentence from death to prison on the following grounds: ineffective assistance of counsel; Pike suffered from mental illness; and capital punishment as administered in Tennessee is unconstitutional.  In a 61-page ruling by U.S. District Judge Harry S. Mattice Jr. issued on March 11, 2016, all grounds were rejected and the requested commutation was denied. On August 22, 2019, having heard the same appeal by Pike's lawyers on October 1, 2018, the three judge United States Court of Appeals for the Sixth Circuit panel unanimously upheld the lower court ruling and denied relief.

Attempted murder conviction 
On August 24, 2001, Pike (with alleged assistance from inmate Natasha Cornett) attacked and attempted to strangle fellow inmate Patricia Jones with a shoe string, and nearly succeeded in choking her to death. Pike was convicted of attempted first degree murder on August 12, 2004. Although it is the position of the Tennessee Department of Corrections that Cornett assisted in this crime, their investigators concluded there was insufficient evidence to charge her with helping Pike attack Jones.

Attempted prison break 
In March 2012, it was revealed that Pike had made escape plans involving corrections officer Justin Heflin and a New Jersey man named Donald Kohut. Though it has never been determined how it exactly began, Kohut, who worked as a personal trainer and was then in his early thirties, entered into a letter writing correspondence with Pike around the beginning of 2011. By July of that year, Kohut was making the close to 1800 mile (by car) round trip from Flemington, New Jersey to Nashville, Tennessee to visit Pike in person on visiting days once or twice a month. Eventually Kohut communicated a plan for her escape to Pike and enlisted the help of corrections officer Heflin, who agreed to participate in return for cash and gifts.

Because of security concerns, the Tennessee Department of Corrections has not provided many details about the plan; however, the eventually unsealed indictment laid out a scenario where a prison key would be traced and then a duplicate created.
 Early in 2012, prison personnel received information about the escape plot. This led to the attempted prison break being thwarted by a joint investigation involving the Tennessee Department of Corrections, the Tennessee Bureau of Investigation (TBI) and the New Jersey State Police. According to the TBI, the plan was not very far along when uncovered and "the jailbreak was not imminent".

In March 2012, Kohut was arrested and charged with bribery and conspiracy to commit escape, while Heflin was arrested and 
charged with bribery, official misconduct and conspiracy to commit escape. Pike was not charged and it was unclear to the investigators if she was a participant in the conspiracy other than being aware of it.

On May 31, 2012, Kohut was sentenced to seven years in prison the time to be served at the Tennessee State Northeast Correctional Complex.
 
Heflin, who cooperated with authorities after his arrest, served no prison time but was terminated from his job with the Tennessee Department of Corrections.

Scheduled execution 
On August 27, 2020, Tennessee Attorney General Herbert Slatery's office requested the Tennessee Supreme Court to set an execution date for Pike. Due to the COVID-19 pandemic in Tennessee and various other factors, Pike's attorneys were granted extensions by the court, allowing them more time to argue as to why Pike should not be executed. The state did not oppose the extensions. On June 7, 2021, Pike's attorneys filed a motion to oppose the execution date and request a Certificate of Commutation. The court is expected to decide on the matter as to whether Pike can be executed or if her sentence will be commuted. If Pike is executed, she would be the first woman to be executed in Tennessee in roughly 200 years.

In popular culture 
The murder of Colleen Slemmer was featured on the TV shows Deadly Women, For My Man, Killer Kids, Martinis and Murder, and Snapped: Killer Couples.
A book was written about the murder, called A Love To Die For, by Patricia Springer.

See also 
 List of death row inmates in the United States
 List of people scheduled to be executed in the United States
 List of women on death row in the United States

References 

1976 births
Living people
American female murderers
American people convicted of attempted murder
American people convicted of murder
American prisoners sentenced to death
Crimes involving Satanism or the occult
People convicted of murder by Tennessee
Prisoners sentenced to death by Tennessee
Women sentenced to death
Violence against women in the United States
1995 murders in the United States
20th-century American criminals
Criminals from West Virginia
People from Beckley, West Virginia